Datong–Qinhuangdao railway or Daqin railway, also known as the Daqin line, is a 653 km coal-transport railway in north China. Its name is derived from its two terminal cities, Datong, a coal mining center in Shanxi province, and Qinhuangdao in Hebei province, on the Bohai Sea.

The electrified double track line serves as a major conduit for moving coal produced in Shanxi, Shaanxi, and Inner Mongolia to Qinhuangdao, China's largest coal-exporting seaport, from there coal is shipped to south China and other countries in Asia.

The railway also passes through the municipalities of Beijing and Tianjin. Unlike most other railways in China, which are run by the state-owned China Railway Corporation, the Daqin railway is operated by Daqin Railway Company Limited, a publicly traded stock company.

Daqin railway carries over 1/5th of the coal transported by rail in China, more coal than any other railway line in China and the world.

The line was constructed in two phases between December 1984 and December 1992, with specifications changed from single-track to double-track during construction. Design capacity was 100 million tonnes a year, which it reached after ten years, but continuous upgrades (wider subgrade, 75 kg/m rails, wagons with higher capacity and top speed, longer trains and stronger locomotives, radio operation and centralised traffic control, automatic train inspection) quadrupled capacity.

In 2006, powerful locomotive models HXD1 and HXD2, with 9.6 MW and 10 MW power output respectively, entered Daqin line to replace the older DJ1 models.

Accidents and incidents 
24 August 2020 - Four cars of a train derailed near Zhuolu railway station in Zhuolu County, Hebei province. No casualties were reported.

14 April 2022 - 17 cars of a freight train derailed after colliding with a parked locomotive near Cuipingshan railway station in Jizhou District, Tianjin, 11 of which fell off from the elevated railway. No casualties or injuries have been reported.

See also

Coal energy in China
List of railways in China
Rail transport in the People's Republic of China

References

Railway lines in China
Mining railways
Rail transport in Shanxi
Rail transport in Hebei
Rail transport in Beijing
Rail transport in Tianjin
Coal in China